Jamar Newsome (born November 5, 1987) is a former American football wide receiver. He was signed by the Jacksonville Jaguars as an undrafted free agent in 2011. He played college football at the University of Central Florida. He has also played for the Pittsburgh Steelers, Kansas City Chiefs, and Dallas Cowboys.

Professional career

Jacksonville Jaguars
After going undrafted in the 2011 NFL Draft, Newsome was signed by the Jacksonville Jaguars. After starting the first two games of the season, Newsome was waived by the Jaguars. He was signed to the teams' practice squad the following day.

Pittsburgh Steelers
On November 2, 2011, Newsome was signed to the Pittsburgh Steelers practice squad and was released on December 1, 2011.

Kansas City Chiefs
On December 4, 2011, Newsome was signed to the Chiefs' practice squad. On November 24, 2012, Newsome was signed to the Chiefs active roster.  Newsome played in six games and started two regular-season games for the Chiefs, catching five passes for 73 yards.

Dallas Cowboys
On September 17, 2013, Newsome was signed to the Cowboys' practice squad. The Cowboys released him during the 2014 preseason.

Personal life
Jamar is a member of the Lambda Omega chapter of Kappa Alpha Psi at the University of Central Florida. Newsome graduated from UCF with a bachelor's degree in criminal justice. Also, Newsome maintains a master's degree in public administration with a specialization in criminal justice from Indiana Wesleyan University.

References

External links
UCF Knights football bio
Jacksonville Jaguars bio
Kansas City Chiefs bio

1987 births
Living people
American football wide receivers
UCF Knights football players
Jacksonville Jaguars players
Pittsburgh Steelers players
Kansas City Chiefs players
Dallas Cowboys players
Players of American football from St. Petersburg, Florida